Ki no Tokibumi (紀 時文, 922 - 996) was a Japanese waka poet and nobleman of the Heian period. As one of the Five Men of the Pear Chamber (梨壺の五人), he assisted in the compilation of the Gosen Wakashū poetry anthology. He also compiled kundoku (訓読) readings for texts from the Man'yōshū.

References

922 births
996 deaths
10th-century Japanese poets
Ki clan